Zhaltusha is a village in Ardino Municipality, Kardzhali Province, southern-central Bulgaria. It covers an area of 6.452 square kilometres and as of 2013 had a population of 926 people.

References

Villages in Kardzhali Province